Vedad Radonja (born 6 September 2001) is an Bosnian professional footballer who plays as a right-back for Greek Super League 2 club AEK Athens B.

Career
Born in Sarajevo, Radonja began his career with the Zeljeznicar Academy before moving to Croatia and joining the youth academy at Dinamo Zagreb. He made two appearances with Dinamo Zagreb II. On 18 September 2020, Radonja signed with Super League Greece side AEK Athens on a five-year contract.

On 20 January 2021, Radonja made his professional debut for AEK Athens in a Greek Cup match against Apollon Smyrnis. He started and played the full match as AEK Athens won 2–0.

Career statistics

Club

References

External links
Profile at the AEK Athens website

2001 births
Living people
Footballers from Sarajevo
Association football fullbacks
Bosnia and Herzegovina footballers
Bosnia and Herzegovina youth international footballers
GNK Dinamo Zagreb II players
AEK Athens F.C. players
First Football League (Croatia) players
Super League Greece players
Bosnia and Herzegovina expatriate footballers
Expatriate footballers in Croatia
Bosnia and Herzegovina expatriate sportspeople in Croatia
Expatriate footballers in Greece
Bosnia and Herzegovina expatriate sportspeople in Greece
AEK Athens F.C. B players